The  Bay Island least gecko (Sphaerodactylus rosaurae) is a species of lizard in the family Sphaerodactylidae. The species is endemic to the Bay Islands in Honduras.

Etymology
The specific name, rosaurae, refers to Lord Moyne's yacht Rosaura, from which the holotype was collected.

Habitat

Reproduction
S. rosaurae is oviparous.

References

Further reading
Frazier, Julius; Pollock, Nick; Holding, Matt; Montgomery, Chad E. (2011). "Geographic Distribution: Sphaerodactylus rosaurae (Bay Island least gecko)". Herpetological Review 42 (3): 391.
Köhler G (2000). Reptilien und Amphibien Mittelamerikas, Band 1: Krokodile, Schildkröten, Echsen. [= Middle American Reptiles and Amphibiens, Volume 1: Crocodilians, Turtles, Lizards]. Offenbach, Germany: Herpeton Verlag. 158 pp. . (Sphaerodactylus rosaurae, p. 51). (in German).
McCranie JR (2018). "The Lizards, Crocodiles, and Turtles of Honduras. Systematics, Distribution, and Conservation". Bulletin of the Museum of Comparative Zoology 15 (1): 1–129.
Parker HW (1940). "Undescribed Anatomical Structures and New Species of Reptiles and Amphibians". Annals and Magazine of Natural History, Eleventh Series 5: 257–274. (Sphaerodactylus rosaurae, new species, p. 264).
Wilson LD, Hahn DE (1973). "The Herpetofauna of the Islas de la Bahía, Honduras". Bulletin of the Florida State Museum, Biological Sciences 17 (2): 93–150. (Sphaerodactylus rosaurae, pp. 106–109, Figures 2A-2D).

Sphaerodactylus
Reptiles of Honduras
Endemic fauna of Honduras
Reptiles described in 1940
Taxa named by Hampton Wildman Parker